Acentrogobius is a genus of gobies native to marine, fresh and brackish waters of the coasts of the Indian Ocean and the western Pacific Ocean.

Acentrogobius matsya is an otolith-based fossil species found in the Burdigalian (Miocene) Quilon Formation of southwestern India.

Species
There are currently 22 recognized species in this genus:
 Acentrogobius caninus Valenciennes, 1837 (Tropical sand goby)
 Acentrogobius cenderawasih G. R. Allen & Erdmann, 2012 (Cenderawasih goby)
 Acentrogobius chlorostigmatoides Bleeker, 1849 (Greenspot goby)
 Acentrogobius cyanomos Bleeker, 1849
 Acentrogobius dayi Koumans, 1941 (Day's goby)
 Acentrogobius ennorensis Menon & Rema Devi, 1980
 Acentrogobius griseus F. Day, 1876 (Grey goby)
 Acentrogobius janthinopterus Bleeker, 1853 (Robust mangrove goby)
 Acentrogobius limarius G. R. Allen, Erdmann & Hadiaty, 2015 (Batanta mud goby) 
 Acentrogobius masoni F. Day, 1873
 Acentrogobius moloanus Herre, 1927 (Barcheek amoya)
 Acentrogobius nebulosus Forsskål, 1775 (Shadow goby)
 Acentrogobius pellidebilis Y. J. Lee & I. S. Kim, 1992
 Acentrogobius pflaumii Bleeker, 1853 (Striped sandgoby)
 Acentrogobius signatus W. K. H. Peters, 1855 
 Acentrogobius simplex Sauvage, 1880 (Bagamoyo goby)
 Acentrogobius suluensis Herre, 1927 (Sulu goby)
 Acentrogobius therezieni Kiener, 1963
 Acentrogobius vanderloosi G. R. Allen, 2015 (Mudslope goby) 
 Acentrogobius viganensis Steindachner, 1893
 Acentrogobius violarisi G. R. Allen, 2015 (Alotau goby) 
 Acentrogobius viridipunctatus Valenciennes, 1837 (Spotted green goby)
 Acentrogobius matsya Carolin, Bajpai, Maurya & Schwarzhans, 2022 (otolith-based fossil species)

References

 
Gobiidae
Taxonomy articles created by Polbot